Jahangir III, was the last ruler of the Paduspanid branch of Nur. He was the son and successor of Sultan Aziz. In 1593/94, he traveled to the court of the Safavid Shah Abbas I, where he handed over his domains to him, and spend the rest of his life in a property near Saveh which Abbas had given to him.

Sources

 
 

16th-century monarchs in Asia
16th-century Iranian people
1590s deaths
Baduspanids
Year of birth unknown